"Alabamy Bound" is a Tin Pan Alley tune written in 1924, with music by Ray Henderson and words by Buddy DeSylva and Bud Green. It was popularized by Al Jolson and included in the musical Kid Boots, where it was sung by Eddie Cantor. Successful recordings of the song were released in 1925 by Paul Whiteman, Isham Jones and Fletcher Henderson (instrumentals), as well as Blossom Seeley, whose vocal version reached number 2 on the charts. The song has sold over a million copies of sheet music and has been included in several films over the years.

Song history
"Alabamy Bound" was the first collaboration between lyricist Buddy DeSylva and composer Ray Henderson, a partnership that would last until 1930 (with lyricist Lew Brown instead of Bud Green). DeSylva gave the song to singer Al Jolson, who liked it and began performing it on every occasion, including special appearances, nightclubs and restaurants. The song became associated with him and a hit before it was even recorded. Sheet music sales exceeded one million.

Given the popularity of the song, it was interpolated into the Broadway show Kid Boots, featuring Eddie Cantor, which reportedly prevented the show from closing for some time. The earliest  recording of the song was made on December 29, 1924, by the Paul Whiteman Orchestra, which was released as a phonograph record in 1925. That year, Blossom Seeley had a #2 hit with her recording, and Isham Jones & His Orchestra made a popular rendition as well. The version recorded by Fletcher Henderson & His Orchestra is noted for its clarinet trio arranged by Don Redman.

In 1941, the song was revived when it was included in The Great American Broadcast, sung by The Ink Spots. In 1954, the song re-entered the charts with a rendition by The Mulcays.

Themes

"Alabamy Bound" has been described as a "bright march-type ditty" with a "southern flavor". The lyrics are written from the point of view of an Alabamian who is returning home, presumably from working in a larger city like New York or Chicago. Ray Henderson's melody and its "driving-train-like rhythm" provides a setting for the scene of this train song. Implicit in the song is the notion of trains as the fastest, safest and most comfortable means of transport at the time, which adds to the positive image of the character returning home. Its reference to the Southern United States was a common thread in many of Jolson's songs, such as "Rock-a-Bye Your Baby with a Dixie Melody" and "Carolina in the Morning".

List of recordings
Early recordings

Other notable recordings
The Mulcays (1954) - They were a harmonica duo and they charted briefly with the song reaching the No. 24 spot in 1954.
Dean Martin (1955) - included in the album Swingin' Down Yonder
Bing Crosby (1957) - included in the album New Tricks. Crosby also recorded the song for the 1975 album A Southern Memoir
Ray Charles (1960) - included in the album The Genius Hits the Road (1960)
Michael Holliday (1961) - included in the album Happy Holliday
Bobby Darin (1962) - included in the album Oh! Look at Me Now

Film appearances
King of Burlesque (1935) when it was sung by the chorus girls.
The Great American Broadcast (1941) - sung by The Ink Spots
Babes on Broadway (1941) - Eddie Peabody on banjo, dubbing for Mickey Rooney
Broadway (1942)
Show Business (1944) - sung a cappella by Eddie Cantor. Performed later by Eddie Cantor, George Murphy, Constance Moore and Joan Davis.
With a Song in My Heart (1952) - performed by Susan Hayward (dubbed by Jane Froman) as part of a medley
The Purple Rose of Cairo (1985) - sung by Jeff Daniels

Videogame appearances

Looney Tunes World of Mayhem as part of the Wackynvasion Season.

References

1924 songs
1925 singles
Songs with lyrics by Bud Green
Songs with lyrics by Buddy DeSylva
Songs with music by Ray Henderson
Songs about trains
Songs about Alabama